Jeff Horner (born August 1, 1983) is an American former basketball player. He is best known as a point guard for the University of Iowa Hawkeyes basketball team. Horner is currently head coach of the Truman State Bulldogs men's basketball team.

Early life and college

Horner was born in Mason City, Iowa.  His father Bob Horner was Mason City High School varsity basketball coach. Horner made a verbal commitment to the University of Iowa while in the ninth grade. Horner's sister Kristin played basketball for Drake University.

High school

Born in Mason City, Iowa, Horner graduated from Mason City High School in Mason City, Iowa in 2002. In his senior season, Horner averaged 31.2 points, 8.7 rebounds, and 6.8 assists per game, leading the prep team to a 21–2 overall record. He shot 53% from the field and 73% from the free throw line as a senior, averaged 25.3 points a game as a junior, along with 10.1 assists and 5.2 rebounds. He averaged 21.2 points, 10.2 assists and five rebounds per game as a sophomore, and led Mason City to 2 state tournament appearances as a junior and senior, with a 38–7 record over those two seasons.

College

At the University of Iowa, Horner played on the Hawkeyes basketball team all four years and graduated in 2006. He missed four games in December 2006 due to injury, ending a streak of 102 consecutive games played. Horner is the career leader in three-pointers (232), ranks second in assists (563) and three-point attempts (635), 14th in career points (1,341), and also totalled 514 career rebounds. He is the only Iowa player ever to total over 1,000 points, 500 rebounds and 500 assists, and the only Iowa player ever to total over 200 points, 100 rebounds, and 100 assists in four seasons. In Big Ten career stats, Horner ranks 7th in assists (612) and three-point FG attempts (713) and 8th in three-point FGs (262) and helped lead the Hawkeyes to a 2006 Big Ten men's basketball tournament championship, being named Big Ten tournament Most Outstanding Player.

Professional career

Playing career

Horner played professional basketball with the Euphony Bree, a team located in Bree, Belgium. He played for Paris Basket Racing in France until 2007. He was signed by the Iowa Energy, an NBA Development League team based out of Des Moines, Iowa, in October 2007.

Coaching career

Horner was the head varsity basketball coach at Valley High School in West Des Moines, Iowa from 2010–2014. In 2014, he became a head of basketball operations at the University of North Dakota. In 2018, he became the head basketball coach at Truman State.

On August 29th, 2019, Horner tweeted that he was diagnosed with testicular cancer on August 13th, 2019. He will begin chemo at the University of Missouri.

In a February, 2021 article, it was announced that Horner was "cancer free".

References

1983 births
Living people
American expatriate basketball people in Belgium
American expatriate basketball people in France
American men's basketball players
Basketball coaches from Iowa
Basketball players from Iowa
Bree BBC players
College men's basketball head coaches in the United States
High school basketball coaches in Iowa
Iowa Energy players
Iowa Hawkeyes men's basketball players
Metropolitans 92 players
North Dakota Fighting Hawks men's basketball coaches
Parade High School All-Americans (boys' basketball)
People from Mason City, Iowa
Point guards
Truman Bulldogs men's basketball coaches